Kmart Australia Limited (/ˈkeɪmɑːrt/ KAY-mart, doing business as Kmart, Kmart Australia, Kmart New Zealand and Kmart Australia And New Zealand and stylised as Kmart) is an Australian chain of retail department stores owned by the Kmart Group division of Wesfarmers.  

The company operates 323 stores across Australia and New Zealand, with its head office located in Mulgrave, Melbourne. Kmart Group, the department store division of Wesfarmers, also owns and operates Target Australia and online retailer Catch.com.au.

History

Kmart Australia Limited was born out of a joint venture between G.J Coles & Coy Limited (Coles) and the S.S. Kresge Company which was the company that operated Kmart stores in the United States. Kresge owned 51% of the common stock in the company and Coles owned the remaining 49%, together they began to develop Kmart stores in Australia in 1968. The first store opened in Burwood East a suburb of Melbourne, Victoria on 30 April 1969 with an estimated 40,000 people passing through the checkouts and taking in over $97,000 (equivalent to A$ in ) on the first day. The store was opened by Mrs HB Cunningham, wife of the president and chairman of the S.S. Kresge Company.
The doors had been closed 45 minutes after opening as a safety measure. The site was renovated in 2010 to be a shopping mall known as Burwood One.

In 1978, Kresge (since 1977 known as the "Kmart Corporation") exchanged its 51% stake in Kmart Australia for a 20% stake in G.J. Coles & Coy (later Coles Myer). In November 1994, Kresge/Kmart Corporation divested its 21.5% stake in Coles Myer.

Kmart expanded to New Zealand in 1988 with a store in Henderson, a suburb of West Auckland.

A long-term licensing agreement between Sears (owner of the U.S. Kmart since 2004) allowed Wesfarmers to use the Kmart name in Australia and New Zealand. In August 2017, Wesfarmers purchased the Kmart brand name for use in Australia and New Zealand for $100 million, ending the licensing agreement.

In 2006, Coles Group announced plans for Kmart, along with BI-LO and the Coles Group liquor brands, to be merged into the Coles brand. The first re-branded store was planned to open in 2007, with 40 stores, mostly former 'Super K' stores divided last decade into separate Coles and Kmart stores, reformed into Coles Superstores. By March 2007 the plans for these super centres were deferred pending the sale of all or part of Coles Group, and in August 2007, incoming owners Wesfarmers said super centres would almost certainly not proceed.

Kmart's performance immediately prior to the Wesfarmers takeover was poor. In May 2007, it reported a sales drop of 3.2% for the third quarter, and an overall drop in sales of 3.9% for the first three-quarters.

In August 2007, Wesfarmers said it would consider selling all or part of Kmart, or converting some stores to the Target brand. Wesfarmers took control of Coles Group in November 2007 and by March 2008 had decided to retain Kmart and invest $300m in the chain over the next five years.

After continuing poor performance in 2009, the 2010 financial year saw a large increase in EBIT, reporting revenue of A$4.02 billion (equivalent to A$ in ) and an EBIT of A$190 million (equivalent to A$ in ), an increase in EBIT of over 74%. This increase was achieved under the leadership of Guy Russo, who focused on lowering prices and who started to introduce more on-trend pieces.

On 15 November 2012, Australia's first multi-level Kmart opened in Adelaide's Rundle Mall.

As of August 2015, Kmart has 214 stores trading across Australia – 52 in New South Wales and the Australian Capital Territory, 47 in Victoria, 41 in Queensland, 23 in Western Australia, 15 in South Australia, 5 in Tasmania and 2 in the Northern Territory. There are 20 stores in New Zealand.

In August 2018, Continental AG acquired Kmart Tyre and Auto Service for $350 million. The business is now called Mycar.

Between 2020 and 2021, a total of 92 Target stores were converted into Kmart stores.

Revenue 
For fiscal year 2020-2021, Kmart Australia reported AU$9.982 billion in revenue with a growth of 8.3% from the previous year.

Store formats

Current store formats
Kmart is a chain of discount department stores that include merchandise such as home entertainment goods, photographic equipment and developing, camping and fishing goods, sporting goods, toys, kitchenware, small appliances, storage & home organisation, confectionery, stationery, books, cards & party goods, furniture, garden supplies, automotive equipment, lighting, hardware, luggage, cosmetics, clothing and footwear. Most Kmarts have photo centres, which also allow Hewlett-Packard's Snapfish customers to collect online orders. The photo centres have operated in conjunction with Hewlett-Packard since 2009, after Kmart ended a 30-year partnership with Kodak Australia. In 2013, Kmart began a roll-out of new store layouts. Garden plant sections were removed, and back of store areas were cut back. There was an expansion of floorspace to stock and an increase in the height of displays. The stores were given a more "Department Store" feel with front of shop checkouts replaced with an area for non-self serve customers to pay at in the centre of the store. Exceptions to this rule, include the Sylvania and Bankstown stores in Sydney both of which retain checkouts at the front and their older store design.In early 2014, Kmart began a company-wide switch from their Hewlett-Packard powered Minilab system back to a Kodak powered Minilab system In 2018, all Kmart stores ceased trading of DVDs, CDs, video games, televisions, video game consoles, DVD players and CD players.
 Kmart 24 Hour stores are similar to regular Kmart stores apart from being open for 24 hours a day, seven days a week, essentially never closing apart from some public holidays or events.  These stores are not visually different apart from a '24 Hours' logo in red appearing next to the Kmart logo.
Anko is Kmart Australia's international brand, with arrangements to sell their products in other department stores in countries such as Thailand and Indonesia. In 2018 Anko launched popup stores in Washington, USA.
K Hub is the brand being used for smaller rural locations that have replaced Target Country stores.

Former store formats
Kmart Tyre and Auto Service (Head Office: Castle Hill, Sydney, New South Wales), was a chain of auto centres that specialises in automotive accessories, car servicing, tyres, check-ups and motor vehicle insurance. Historically, these stores are usually (but not always) attached to a Kmart store. In early 2006 a number of vehicle servicing facilities at Coles Express service stations became Kmart Tyre & Auto Service outlets which was formerly Shell Autoserv and AutoCare network. As of August 2015 there were 246 Kmart Tyre & Auto Service outlets throughout Australia. In August 2018 Wesfarmers announced that it had entered an agreement to sell Kmart Tyre & Auto Service for $350 million to Continental AG. These stores have since been rebranded under the banner MyCar and are no longer affiliated with the Kmart brand.

Kmart Garden Supercentre was specialised in garden, plants and garden furniture. Most of these stores were standalone, "big box" stores in a warehouse format that sold Kmart manufactured or branded outdoor living items. From 1999 to 2007 there were six nurseries, four in Victoria (Chadstone, Campbellfield, Narre Warren, and Taylors Lakes), plus Windsor (Queensland) and Casula (New South Wales). In 2007 Kmart closed its Windsor store and its Chadstone, Casula, Narre Warren and Taylors Lakes stores were renamed into Flower Power. In 2013 Flower Power closed all its nurseries which were formerly Kmart nurseries with the sole exception of the Campbellfield store, (the only store integrated with an existing Kmart store) which was downsized instead, claiming the concept didn't fit its future business strategy. In 2016 this store was also shut down and transformed and it was replaced by Aldi (which opened in August 2017).
Super Kmart was a hypermarket concept launched in the 1983 financial year with four stores (two in New South Wales and one each in Western Australia and Victoria). The concept consisted of approximately 9,000 square metres comprising a Kmart discount department store and supermarket within one retail space. Super Kmart was expanded to 34 locations by 1990 when  the concept was discontinued and the stores split into separate Kmart discount department stores and Coles New World supermarkets. The stores had been operated under an independent division and the cost of duplicating administration functions as well as lower sales results compared to separate Kmart and Coles New World supermarket lead to the discontinuation of the concept.
Holly's Restaurant During the 1980s and 1990s, every Kmart store had a Holly's in-store restaurant. Starting from the late 1980s, they were progressively shut down across the country, with the last Holly's at Kmart Horsham closing down on 25 June 2010.
Girl Xpress was planned as a clothing store chain for young urban women. A concept store was trialled at Burwood East, Victoria from 2005, however was later discontinued. Girl Xpress has been retained however, as a Kmart house brand.
Kmart Clearance Centre was a briefly trialled clearance centre concept at Ringwood from November 2006 until June 2007.
Kmart Food were supermarkets initially opened adjacent to Kmart discount department stores. By June 1975 there were 21 Kmart Food supermarkets The supermarkets were rebranded as Coles New World supermarkets during the 1976 financial year.
ColMart was a joint Coles New World supermarket and variety store located in Whyalla, South Australia in the 1980s.

Community

Kmart Wishing Tree Appeal
Since 1988, Kmart and The Salvation Army have collected over five million gifts from customers, which are then distributed to those in need. The concept for the Kmart Wishing Tree Appeal first came about when Eve Mitchell, a team member from the Kmart store in Noarlunga suggested Kmart use its network of stores as gift collection points, assisting charity groups at Christmas. Over 464,000 gifts were donated to the 2010 appeal.

Controversy

Anzac Day
In February 2010, Kmart requested permission from the NSW State Government to open their stores on Anzac Day (a day of remembrance) prior to the traditional 1 pm time, claiming their customers would be inconvenienced by their closure. The request was heavily criticised by politicians, ex-Diggers (veterans), and customers. Kmart's Managing Director Guy Russo withdrew the request in early March, saying, "I got this one wrong and on behalf of Kmart, I apologise."

Influencer marketing 
A report from the online New Zealand magazine The Spinoff revealed that two prominent online "influencers" were paid by a PR company working for Kmart when they appeared in a 1 News segment where they appeared to extol the brand.

See also
Kmart, operated by Transformco.
Target, a sister company to Kmart.
Big W, one of Kmart's main competitors.

References

External links
 Kmart Australia
 Kmart New Zealand

Discount stores of Australia
Department stores of Australia
Department stores of New Zealand
Retail companies established in 1969
1969 establishments in Australia
Coles Group
Clothing retailers of Australia
Toy retailers of Australia
Companies based in Melbourne